Channel U may refer to these television channels:

Channel U (Singaporean TV channel), a Chinese-language channel
Channel U (UK) a former UK music video channel from 2003 to 2009